Joseph Curtis Salmons is an American linguist who is Professor of Language Sciences at University of Wisconsin – Madison.

Biography
Joe Salmons received his BA in Philosophy from the University of North Carolina at Charlotte 1978, and his PhD in Germanic Linguistics from the University of Texas at Austin in 1984. He subsequently served as Assistant Professor (1985-1991) and Associate Professor (1991-1995) of German and Linguistics at Purdue University. Since 1995, Salmons has served as Associate Professor (1995-1997) and Professor (1997-2017) of German, and Professor of Language Sciences (2017-) at the University of Wisconsin – Madison.

Salmons specializes in Germanic linguistics and works increasingly on Algonquian languages. He primarily researches language change and linguistic theory, particularly sound systems. Salmons is the author numerous monographs, including A History of German (2018), and co-editor with Patrick Honeybone of the Oxford Handbook of Historical Phonology (2015). He edited the journal Diachronica from 2002-2020 and is on the editorial board of numerous scholarly journals, and has held leading positions at several scholarly societies. Salmons co-founded the Center for the Study of Upper Midwestern Cultures with Jim Leary and has served as director for much of its existence. He was elected a Fellow of the Linguistic Society of America in 2018.

Selected works
 Accentual Change and Language Contact, 1992
 The Glottalic Theory, 1993
 A History of German, 2018
 Sound Change, 2021

Sources

External links
 Website of Joe Salmons
 Joe Salmons at the website of the University of Wisconsin–Madison
 

American editors
American non-fiction writers
American philologists
Fellows of the Linguistic Society of America
Living people
Germanic studies scholars
Germanists
Linguists of Germanic languages
Purdue University faculty
University of North Carolina at Charlotte alumni
University of Texas at Austin alumni
University of Wisconsin–Madison faculty
Year of birth missing (living people)